Morton's toe is the condition of having a first metatarsal bone that is shorter than the second metatarsal (see diagram). It is a type of brachymetatarsia.

This condition is the result of a premature closing of the first metatarsal's growth plate, resulting in a short big toe, giving the second toe the appearance of being long compared to the first toe.

The metatarsal bones behind the toes are of different lengths, and the relative lengths vary between people. For most feet, a smooth curve can be traced through the joints at the bases of the toes (the metatarsal-phalangeal, or MTP, joints). But in Morton's foot, the line has to bend more sharply to go through the base of the big toe, as shown in the diagram. This is because the first metatarsal, behind the big toe, is short compared to the second metatarsal, next to it. The longer second metatarsal puts the MTP joint at the base of the second toe further forward.

If the big toe and the second toe are the same length (as measured from the MTP joint to the tip, including only the toe bones or phalanges), then the second toe will protrude farther than the big toe, as shown in the photo. If the second toe is shorter than the big toe, the big toe may still protrude the furthest, or there may be little difference.

Presentation

The most common symptom experienced due to Morton's toe is callusing and/or discomfort of the ball of the foot at the base of the second toe. The first metatarsal head (toeward end of the metatarsal, at the base of the big toe) would normally bear the majority of a person's body weight during the propulsive phases of gait, but because the second metatarsal head is farthest forward, the force is transferred there. Pain may also be felt in the arch of the foot, at the ankleward end of the first and second metatarsals.

In shoe-wearing cultures, Morton's toe can be problematic. For instance, wearing shoes with a profile that does not accommodate a longer second toe may cause foot pain. A small (80-person) study found no statistically significant difference in the frequency of longer second toes between people with and without ingrown toenails, but tight and ill-fitting shoes are generally considered to increase the risk of ingrown toenails, and shoes are often too tight on the toes. A tight shoe toe box can also cause hammer toes.

Associated condition
Among the issues associated with Morton's toe is that the weight distribution causes the front of the foot to widen as the weight shifts from the first shortened toe to the others. Regular shoes will often cause metatarsalgia and neuromas as the shoe pushes together the toes hence the case of Morton's neuroma.  Wide shoes are recommended.

Treatment
Asymptomatic anatomical variations in feet generally do not need treatment.

Conservative treatment for foot pain with Morton's toe may involve exercises or placing a flexible pad under the first toe and metatarsal; an early version of the latter treatment was once patented by Dudley Joy Morton. Restoring the Morton's toe to normal function with proprioceptive orthotics can help alleviate numerous problems of the feet such as metatarsalgia, hammer toes, bunions, Morton's neuroma, plantar fasciitis and general fatigue of the feet. Rare cases of disabling pain are sometimes treated surgically.

Prevalence
Morton's toe is a minority variant of foot shape. Its recorded prevalence varies in different populations, with estimates from 2.95% to 22%.

Etymology
The name derives from American orthopedic surgeon Dudley Joy Morton (1884–1960), who originally described it as part of Morton's triad (a.k.a. Morton's syndrome or Morton's foot syndrome): a congenital short first metatarsal bone, a hypermobile first metatarsal segment and calluses under the second and third metatarsals.

Confusion has arisen from "Morton's foot" being used for a different condition, Morton's metatarsalgia, which affects the space between the bones and is named after Thomas George Morton (1835–1903).

Culture 
Morton's toe, especially the second-toe-is-longer versions, has a long association with disputed anthropological and ethnic interpretations. Morton called it Metatarsus atavicus, considering it an atavism recalling prehuman grasping toes. In statuary and shoe fitting, a more-protuberant second toe has been called the Greek foot (as opposed to the Egyptian foot, where the great toe is longer). It was an idealized form in Greek sculpture, and this persisted as an aesthetic standard through Roman and Renaissance periods and later (the Statue of Liberty has toes of this proportion). There are also associations found within Celtic groups. The French call it commonly pied grec (just as the Italians call it piede greco) but sometimes pied ancestral or pied de Néanderthal.

See also

 Digit ratio
 Foot
 List of Mendelian traits in humans (Morton's toe is not on the list)
 Runner's toe, repetitive injury seen in runners

References

Sources

 Morton, D. J. "Metatarsus atavicus: the identification of a distinct type of foot disorder", The Journal of Bone and Joint Surgery, Boston, 1927, 9: 531-544.
 Toes, relative lengths of first and second Online Mendelian Inheritance in Man.
 EFORT – European Federation of National Associations of Orthopaedics and Traumatology: Scientific Library: Concepts of the human foot in mythology, art and surgery, John Kirkup, EFORT (Bulletin of European Orthopaedics), #11, Nov. 1999.
 "British feet" Discover Magazine, June, 1996, Retrieved June, 2021.
 

Foot diseases
Skeletal disorders
Toes